Casa de la Cultura (English: "House of Culture"), or Casa de la Cultura en Puebla, is a cultural center in the city of Puebla's historic centre, in the Mexican state of Puebla.

See also
 Biblioteca Palafoxiana

References

External links
 

Buildings and structures in Puebla (city)
Cultural centers in Mexico
Historic centre of Puebla